is a dam in Saito, Miyazaki Prefecture, Japan, completed in 1963.

Many roads, schools, houses and farmland were submerged in the construction

References 

Dams in Miyazaki Prefecture
Dams completed in 1963